Pseudophilautus nemus, known as whistling shrub frog, is a species of frogs in the family Rhacophoridae.

It is endemic to Sri Lanka.

Its natural habitat is subtropical or tropical moist lowland forests.
It is threatened by habitat loss.

References

nemus
Endemic fauna of Sri Lanka
Frogs of Sri Lanka
Taxa named by Rohan Pethiyagoda
Amphibians described in 2004
Taxonomy articles created by Polbot